The Slavic creation myth is a cosmogonic myth in Slavic mythology that explains how the world was created, who created it, and what principles guide it. This myth, in its Christianized form, survived until the nineteenth and twentieth century in various parts of the Slavdom in chronicles or folklore. In the Slavic mythology there are three versions of this myth: the first version is the so-called earth-diver myth, which intertwines two main motifs: the dualistic motif – the cooperation of God and the Devil (that is, the "good god" and the "bad god") is required to create the world, and the oceanic motif – the pre-existence water, where the seed of the Earth comes from; the second version speaks about the origin of the universe and the world from the Cosmic Egg and the World Tree; the third one about creation from a dismemberment of a primordial being.

Creation of the world

Creation by diving 
The myth that has been preserved from Poland comes from the Sieradz Land and was written down in 1898:

In the Russian and Ukrainian variants, the devil retains some of the sand created under the tongue, and when the Earth begins to grow, the sand bursts out his mouth. This myth was written by the Russian slavist Alexander Afanasyev, who was one of the first researchers to study Russian folklore in 1859:

The dualistic creation myth by "evil god" diving has 24 credentials in Balto-Slavic areas and 12 credentials in Finno-Ugric areas. The Bulgarian myth does not mention the Devil's catastrophe, but it develops the theme of creation by the formula "by God's and my power", and the Devil, who twice reversed the order of the formula, could not reach the bottom until the third time he pronounced the formula correctly, reached the bottom.

The Moldavian variant also ends with the expansion of the Earth and the Transylvanian Romani extended the dualistic motif by punishing the devil by the bull and the Tree of Life, from which the people were formed. Only in a myth from Slovenia God goes to the bottom of the waters on His own. In another version of the myth, the Devil tries to push God into the sea to become the only creator – first he pushes him east, then west, south and north, but the land always expands. Annoyed by this fact, the Devil awakens God and tells him that it is time to bless the Earth, since it has grown so big. God suits him: "Once you carried me four ways to the water to throw me into it, you drew a cross with me, and this is how I blessed the earth myself." Then God goes to the Heavens and Devil, who attacked him, was thrown down into the abyss by lightning. 

Seemingly, the consecration of the earth seems to be a Christian motif, but this motif is used in myths to set directions and exists in other mythologies: according to the Maidu, the Earth Maker descended into the cosmic center of the world and there he met a Coyote (a trickster figure), who after the creation of the world went to sleep. The Earth Maker stretched the earth from the south, through the west, to the north, and when the Coyote woke up, he stretched the earth to the east. When the Earth Maker was left alone, he went around the earth, staggering a full circle, fixing (in one version of the myth) the Earth to cardinal directions with stone hooks. For some Indian tribes, therefore, determining the directions of the world is a religious activity and for this reason, the Mexican Huicholas interpret Christian sign of the cross as an imitation of the Indian myth. For the Slavs, therefore, "consecration to the Earth" is the structuring of the universe and the designation of the directions of the Earth, and the extension of the point state "to infinity". Yet another myth says that the earth grows all the time and God, who is left alone, does not know how to stop it. So God sends a bee to overhear the Devil. The Devil, laughing at God, says to himself: a stupid God does not know that you have to take some stick, draw the sign of the cross and say "Enough of this Earth!" When the Devil saw a bee running away on his shoulder, he tried to catch it, but it ran away from him, so he cursed her master: "May he who sent you here eat your dung," and God, who heard this, ordered the bee to produce honey from now on. A myth from Dobrzyń Land says that the Devil tells the duck to steal some earth from God, and when she was returning with the earth in her beak, she was captured by a hawk, who started choking her, and from the earth that fell out of her beak, mountains were created. For the creation of the world or of a being, the cooperation of God and the Devil is always required, who are endowed with equal power.

Researchers also identify Slavic gods who hide under the Christian terms God and Devil. The Slavic word for God Bog or Boh was used by Christian missionaries as an equivalent of the Latin Deus and the Greek Theos because it corresponded meaningfully to the notion of a supernatural being, but in the Slavic religion, Bog always appears in compound names, i.e. Daž-bog, Stri-bog, Cherno-bog, or in names i.e. Boži-dar, Bohu-mil, Bogu-slav, etc., so most probably God was not a proper name for the figure mentioned in the myths of creation. When interpreting the figure of God, the text of Procopius on the religion of the Slavs may be helpful:

, analyzing the folk image of the Christian God, indicates that God sits in heaven, sends rains in anger, shoots lightning at evil spirits, rules predatory animals and fate. These features indicate a god-thunderer, and therefore most likely Perun was replaced by God. Perun is one of the oldest Indo-European gods and is descended from the Proto-Indo-European storm god *perkʷunos. His name probably means literally the "Striking One" (compare Proto-Slavic *pьrati - "to beat, to hit"). The core *perkʷ means oak (cf. Latin querqus - "oak") - a sacred tree dedicated to Perun. In Ruthenian chronicles, he is presented as gray-haired, which would distinguish him from the Celtic Taranis, Germanic Thor or Hindu Indra as war gods, and made him resemble Roman Jupiter and Greek Zeus as rulers. However, according to some researchers, such as Henryk Łowmiański, the description of God rather points to Svarog. The Devil is interpreted as Veles, the god of the underworld. In Primary Chronicle, the Ruthenians, when making an alliance with the Greeks, swear on Perun and Veles, which may suggest that Veles' power was comparable to that of Perun. In Polish (and in some other Slavic languages too), just as Perun (Piorun) was devalued to the piorun "lightning", so Veles was devalued to the veles "devil, demon" in Czech. In South Slavic folklore, St. Elijah, the Christianized Perun, is often opposed to St. Nicholas, the Christianized Veles. The creation myth also fits Chernobog (lit. "Black God") and Belobog (lit. "White God"), who were to be worshiped by the Polabian Slavs:

This myth may come from some ancient substrate, perhaps pre-European, assimilated by the Slavs and subjected to further transformations. This myth could also be perpetuated under the influence of the Persian antithetical couple Ahura Mazda and Ahriman, who left their mark in various syncretic religions. Bogomil's influence was also suggested: the followers of this religion claimed that the main drama of creation was the conflict between two brothers: the older Satanael (the suffix -el adds the divine element to Devil) and the younger Jesus (Savaof – the Word = Logos-Christ) – Satanael created the world and man, and God sent him the Word in the form of Jesus to save them. In the 16th century Legend of the Tiberian Sea, God, when he hovered over the water, saw Satanael as a water bird and ordered him to dive into the sea. According to the critics of this theory, it has serious shortcomings: the full text of this myth does not appear in any Bogomil texts, and this myth does not exist in areas dominated by Bogomilism, also in Western Europe, where the Cathars influenced the local folklore. This myth, however, existed in the territories of Poland, Ukraine and Belarus, where the Bogomil faith never reached.

Creation from the Cosmic Egg 

The myth in which the creation of the world from the Cosmic Egg or World Egg can be found in the Carpathian carol also written down by Afanasayev:

This carol contains three elements: the first one is two pigeons sitting on an oak tree, the second one is the catching of sand and stones by birds, the third is the creation of the world. Two pigeons, birds, hens or bees sitting in the crown of the tree is a popular motif among the Slavs – it represents the World Tree. In folklore, the World Tree stands in the "navel of the world", it is supposed to be heavy, tall and with a wide leaf. In a similar preserved myth, God throws his staff into the water, which then changes into a tree. On its branch, God and the Devil sit down to take the world out of the water. The relationship of this prayer with the World Egg is indicated by the "fine sand" from which the "black earth" and the "blue stones" from which the heaven and the celestial objects are made. This corresponds to the widespread myths of the Cosmic Egg, which is broken down in the creative act, and from whose lower shell the Earth is formed, and from whose upper shell the Heavens are formed.

Vladimir Toporov also points to the existence of this myth in Russian fairy tales. In these fairy tales, the hero, looking for a princess, travels through three kingdoms, and after defeating three vipers, the kingdoms are reduced to three eggs. 

Fairy-tale eggs are generally submerged in water and their extraction and breaking up creates a "kingdom" – a world in fairy tongue. Also, the triple of egg-kingdoms is not accidental – it corresponds to the tripartite division of the world in Indo-European mythologies into Heaven (Vyraj), Earth and the Underworld (Nav). In Dobrzyń Land, it was directly believed that the world was created from an egg lying on a giant tree and the story of the princess from the egg, which the prince was to marry, was preserved: she was tricked by a witch into a duck that was killed, whose blood then grew into an apple tree. From Slovenia the myth has survived, where God sends a rooster to earth, who lays an egg from which seven rivers are poured:

There were also riddles in Poland that pointed to the egg: "There is a world. And in this world there is a yellow flower" or "There is a white world. And in this world a yellow flower".

Creation from dismemberment 
Another kind of creation myth has survived: the creation of the world from a dismembered first human or another being. Polish scholar Stanislaw Schayer recalled the text from the Dove Book, which was a collection of oral stories of the clergy, the following story: a great book fell from heaven, in which the history of being was written; kings ask tsar David to read it, but the book is too big, but David, inspired by the Holy Spirit, will answer three questions; the first one concerns the creation of the world:

In four variants, the last three lines replace the text:

This myth is most likely not a Christian influence, but Slavic phraseology has been Christianized, probably under the influence of the apocryphal Book of Enoch, in which the same was done with the Iranian myth, which in turn could have been the source of the Russian myth. A similar motif is present in other Indo-European myths: in Hindu mythology a society was formed from the body of Purusha – the first man: Brahmins from the mouth, warriors from the shoulders, peasants from the hips, shudras from the feet; in Scandinavia this being was Ymir and in Iran Gayōmart.

Functioning of the world 

The world is sustained by animals or fish. In the myth described by Afanasayev, the world is sustained by whales: at first there were seven of them, but three are gone and four are left. Then one died and three are left and therefore the world is crooked. A similar myth, where the fall of one of the "pillars of the world" causes a catastrophe, occurs, for example, in China. Such a decomposition of the original seven: 3 + 1 + 3 can testify to the multiplicity of worlds - three were before ours and three will be after ours. A similar motif exists among Hopi Indians or in the doctrine of the five worlds of Bambara. The world, in order not to break, is wrapped around it is the Zmiy or Zmiya (Viper). This can mean a constant threat from one of the creators. A similar theme exists in Nordic mythology (Jörmungandr).

The dome of the world was made of stone, sometimes of silicon, which explained the formation of lightning, or of blue gemstone, which is a symbol of the stated time. The dome, especially in the Western Slavs, was based on a "pillar". (a kind of Axis Mundi – Cosmic Tree) running from the Pole Star, which rotates the whole vault. The location of the contact between the pillar and the vault and the ground had specific characteristics: these places were called the zabka (frog) or sierdzeń (gudgeon pin), which is connected to the constellation of the Great and Little Wagon.

In the Slavs, the souls of the dead travelled to the Undergrounds via a bridge - at night it was the Milky Way and during the day it was a rainbow. In the materials collected by  such a Milky Way is called the Way of the Soul, the Way of the [blue] Army and it was spilled with stardust. The other Axis Mundi connecting the worlds was the Tree of the Family, connected to the dziady – the deceased's name is also his identity, and it lasts until someone mentions his name, until his name is forgotten and he joins the nameless group of souls. The souls already in the afterlife return to Earth in the rays of the sun.

For the Slavs, Cosmic Trees could function as Cosmic Mountains. Mountains were often treated as magical places, temples were built on them or rituals were performed there. The mountains such as Ślęża, Kyiv Hill or Bald Mountain were especially popular, the Montenegrins called Durmitor mountain "the Blue Column", and the Slovaks considered Kriváň as a sacred mountain. In Kievan Rus' it was believed that "the high mountain of Triglav appeared first from the water".

References

Bibliography 
 
 
 
 
 
 

Slavic mythology
Creation myths